Lorin Miller (1800–1888) was a pioneer mayor of Omaha, Nebraska. He served as the Mayor from 1865 to 1867. Miller arrived in Omaha on October 19, 1854 and began surveying immediately. He was responsible for surveying Jeffrey's addition, as well as the notorious Scriptown. Prominent Omaha leader George L. Miller, born in 1830, was Lorin's oldest son.

See also
 History of Omaha

References

1800 births
1888 deaths
Mayors of Omaha, Nebraska
Burials at Prospect Hill Cemetery (North Omaha, Nebraska)
19th-century American politicians